Sophy Romvari (born October 20, 1990) is a Canadian film director, writer, and actress. She attracted widespread acclaim for her short film Still Processing (2020). The film premiered at the 2020 Toronto International Film Festival and was later released online by Mubi. A collection of Romvari's short films, including Still Processing, were subsequently released by The Criterion Collection on their streaming platform in 2022.

Her other notable films include Pumpkin Movie, which screened at the 2017 Hot Docs Canadian International Documentary Festival, and Norman/Norman, which screened at the 2018 Toronto International Film Festival. Her work has screened at film festivals internationally, such as at the Sheffield Doc/Fest, Indie Memphis, and the True/False Film Festival.

Career
Romvari began making films in the mid-2010s, around 2013, while in film school. In 2017, Romvari's short documentary film Pumpkin Movie premiered at True/False Film Festival and screened at the Hot Docs Canadian International Documentary Festival and Sheffield Doc/Fest. In 2018, her short Norman Norman premiered at the Toronto International Film Festival.

Romvari also directed In Dog Years (2019), a short documentary for CBC Short Docs. The following year, her short documentary Remembrance of József Romvári (2020), about her grandfather who was a production designer in the Hungarian film industry, was included as a DVD special feature for three films by Hungarian director István Szabó, and distributed by Kino Lorber.

Still Processing, Romvari's thesis film from York University, attracted widespread critical acclaim and premiered at the 2020 Toronto International Film Festival. It was later released online by Mubi in 2021.

A collection of Romvari's short films, including Still Processing, were subsequently released by The Criterion Collection on their streaming platform in 2022.

Her 2022 short film, It's What Each Person Needs, premiered at the Toronto International Film Festival, marking her third short film to premiere at the festival after Norman/Norman in 2018 and Still Processing in 2020, and was called a "stunning analysis on the foundations of identity."

Filmography

Acting roles 
 Let Your Heart Be Light (2016)
From Nine to Nine (2016)
 Pumpkin Movie (2017)
 Spice It Up (2018)
The Sunless Remembered (2018)
Preface to History (2019)
Tiger Eats a Baby (2020)

References

Notes

External links

 

1990 births
21st-century Canadian screenwriters
21st-century Canadian women writers
Canadian women film directors
Canadian women screenwriters
Canadian women film producers
Film directors from Victoria, British Columbia
Canadian documentary film directors
Writers from Victoria, British Columbia
Canadian people of Hungarian descent
Living people
Canadian women documentary filmmakers
York University alumni